Gary Pigrée (born 22 May 1988) is a French Guianan footballer who currently plays as a striker for CSC Cayenne of the Promotion d'Honneur, the second division of the French Guiana football league system. He is also a member of the French Guiana national football team.

Club career
Since 2009, Pigrée has played for AJ Saint-Georges in his native French Guiana.  For the 2011/2012 season, he was the league's top scorer with 15 goals in 20 matches.

International career
Pigrée made his international debut on 21 March 2012 in a friendly against Guyana. He has since been part of the squad for the 2012 Caribbean Cup and 2012 Coupe de l'Outre-Mer.

International goals

Scores and results list French Guiana's goal tally first, score column indicates score after each Pigrée goal.

See also 
 List of top international men's football goalscorers by country

References

1988 births
Living people
Association football forwards
French Guianan footballers
French Guiana international footballers
AJ Saint-Georges players
2014 Caribbean Cup players